Pinus merkusii, the Merkus pine or Sumatran pine, is a pine native to the Malesia region of southeast Asia, and the only one that occurs naturally south of the equator.

Description
The bark is orange-red, thick and deeply fissured at the base of the trunk, and thin and flaky in the upper crown.

They open to 4–5 cm broad at maturity to release the seeds.

Related species 
Pinus merkusii is closely related to the Tenasserim pine (P. latteri), which occurs farther north in southeast Asia from Myanmar to Vietnam; some botanists treat the two as conspecific (under the name P. merkusii, which was described first), but P. latteri differs in longer and stouter (over 1 mm thick) leaves and larger cones with thicker scales, the cones often remaining closed for some time after maturity. It is also related to the group of Mediterranean pines including Aleppo pine and Turkish pine, which share many features with it.

Distribution
It can be found mainly in Indonesia in the mountains of northern Sumatra, and with two outlying populations in central Sumatra on Mount Kerinci and Mount Talang, and in the Philippines on Mindoro and in the Zambales Mountains on western Luzon.

The population in central Sumatra, between 1° 40' and 2° 06' S latitude, is the only natural occurrence of any member of the Pinaceae south of the Equator.

References

Merkusii
Trees of Sumatra
Trees of the Philippines
Vulnerable plants